Walter Harry Bradshaw (2 August 1906 – 30 October 1989) was an English cricketer.  Bradshaw was a right-handed batsman.  He was born in Teddington, Middlesex.

Bradshaw made his first-class debut for Leicestershire against Gloucestershire in the 1929 County Championship.  He made 2 further first-class appearances, both coming in 1929, against Gloucestershire and Lancashire.  With the bat, he scored 38 runs at an average of 7.60, with a high score of 20.

His brother, James, and cousin, also called James, both played first-class cricket for Leicestershire.  He died in Leicester, Leicestershire on 30 October 1989.

References

External links

1906 births
1989 deaths
People from Teddington
English cricketers
Leicestershire cricketers